The Northeast Texas Trail (NETT) is a planned 130+-mile multi-use trail along the route, following alongside U.S. Highway 82 and Texas State Highway 34. When complete, the trail will connect 19 cities spread over seven counties, stretching from the edge of the Dallas–Fort Worth metroplex to the Texarkana metropolitan area along the Arkansas border.

When completed the Northeast Texas Trail will be the longest hike/bike and equestrian trail in Texas and the fifth longest in the United States. The trail is being designed to provide access for hikers, mountain bicyclists, and in some sections, equestrians. It will be accessible by trailheads running through cities along the trail, while the trail will extend into more remote areas between the cities. The first trail section, the 2.36 multi-use portion "Trail de Paris" was dedicated in 2004.

Scattered along the trail are several creeks and over one hundred rail bridges, including a crossing of the Sulphur River and many branches of Kickapoo Creek.

History
In the late 1990s, two railroads—the Union Pacific Railroad and the Chaparral Railroad decided to cease active service and publicized their railroad corridors availability for rail banking through the Surface Transportation Board of the United States Department of Transportation. Three private organizations Rails-to-Trails Conservancy (RTC) 1997, Greater Paris Development Foundation (GPDF) 1996, and Chaparral Rails to Trails Inc. (CRT) 1995.

Farmersville to Paris, TX.
Thw Famersville to Paris, Texas,  right-of-way was constructed in 1886 by the Gulf, Colorado and Santa Fe Railway to connect the railroad with a northern connection: the St. Louis-San Francisco Railway in Paris, TX. GC&SF became a  Texas-based subsidiary of the Atchison, Topeka and Santa Fe Railroad in the same year, 1886.  In 1990, the Kiamichi Railroad, a regional company with a presence in nearby states of Arkansas and Oklahoma, desired access into Dallas from their mainline in Purcell, OK. This segment of railway would provide the connection, and thus, they purchased this line from the AT&SF and created a subsidiary company, the Chaparral Railroad, to operate it. The railroad was not profitable and the line was railbanked*  in 1995 and "transferred" to the Chaparral Rails to Trails, Inc.  Today, the right-of-way serves as the 62-mile Chaparral Rails to Trails section of the Northeast Texas Trail, (NETT), connecting Farmersville with Paris, TX. The Audie Murphy Trailhead Park and Santa Fe Farmersville Onion Shed are located at the western terminus of the trail in Farmersville, TX.

Paris to New Boston, TX.
The Paris to New Boston, Texas, line was constructed in 1876 by the Texas & Pacific Railway Company.  It was a part of Jay Gould's Transcontinental Branch of the T&P Railway, connecting Texarkana, Texas, with Sherman, Texas.  The line reached Paris, TX in 1876. MP took control of the T&P in, 1976. UP took control of the MP in 1997. Union Pacific decided to cease active service of the line in the late 1990's. The right-of-way was railbanked*  and  transferred to the Rails-to-Trails Conservancy in 1997.
Today, the right-of-way serves as the Northeast Texas Trail, (NETT), connecting the 68 miles between Paris, Texas, and New Boston, Texas, at the T&P Trailhead Park.
 Railbanking. Rather than abandoning  railroad routes and losing the right-of-way easements, railroads agree to a legal process called railbanking, which allows for the use of the right-of-way as trails, until and if they are needed for rail service in the future. 

Sources: 
http://www.trainweb.org/texasandpacific/history.html
http://mopac.org/corporate-history/74-timeline-mp-and-predecessors
https://www.texasmonthly.com/travel/traveling-130-miles-along-northeast-texas-trail/

This adaptive re-use of unused railroad tracks unifies many northeast Texas counties and cities and provides a major recreational amenity for the more than 47,500 people who live and work within a mile of the Trail. The new, partly completed trail attracts pedestrians and nature-lovers, both Texas residents and visitors.

Trail by County
The section of the trail that runs through Collin, Hunt and Fannin counties, from the western trailhead, Farmersville to Pecan Gap is open, as is a large section from Lamar County to Red River County (Paris to Clarksville) has been cleared, and currently parts of the NETT trail are being rerouted to pass around uncleared portions of the trail. Large sections of the trail through Collin, Fannin, Hunt, Lamar and Red River counties have been cleared.  Much of the remaining mileage requires additional work clearing the trail over overgrowth.

Collin County
 Farmersville (Western Trailhead) to Merit - 5 miles - Open

Hunt County
 Merit to Celeste - 7.7 miles - Open
 Celeste to Wolfe City - 8.7 miles - Open

Fannin County
 Wolfe City to Ladonia - 8.6 miles - Open
 Ladonia to Pecan Gap - 5.8 miles - Open
 Pecan Gap to Ben Franklin - 5.4 miles - Closed, bypass on FM 128

Lamar County
 Ben Franklin to Roxton - 5.6 miles - Closed, due to collapsed bridge, bypass on FM 38
 Roxton to Paris - 14.4 miles - Closed, bypass on FM 137
 Paris to Reno - 5.9 miles  - Open
 Reno to Blossom - 1.8 miles - Open
 Blossom to Detroit - 6.6 miles - Open

Red River County
 Detroit to Bagwell - 6.2 miles - Open
 Bagwell to Clarksville - 7.0 miles - Open
 Clarksville to Annona - 8.2 miles - Closed, bypass on US 82
 Annona to Avery - 8.4 miles - Closed, bypass on US 82, FM 4305

Bowie County
 Avery to DeKalb - 10.3 miles - Open
 DeKalb to Malta to New Boston (Eastern Trailhead) - Closed, bypass on US 82

Northeast Texas Trail Coalition
The Northeast Texas Trail Coalition is the 501(c)(3) nonprofit organization working on the Northeast Texas Trail. It partners with governments, nonprofit land trusts, and volunteer organizations in all seven Northeast Texas counties to help protect and preserve, plan, construct, and promote the Northeast Texas Trail.  The coalition aims to complete clearing and grading of the entire 130 miles of the NETT in 2015.

Five of the seven expansions have been the result of the Friends of the Trail partnering with Lamar County, City of Reno, City of Blossom and 3 times with the City of Paris to write the application and be awarded Texas Parks and Wildlife’s (TPWD) Texas Recreational Trails Fund grants. The Cities of Farmersville, Clarksville, and New Boston have also been successful in obtaining a TPWD grants to construct trails on their sections of the NETT corridor.

The Council meets monthly and quarterly rotating between cities along and supporting the trail.

See also

References

External links
 Official website

Hiking trails in Texas
Rail trails in Texas
Bike paths in Texas